The 1921–22 FA Cup was the 47th season of the world's oldest association football competition, the Football Association Challenge Cup (more usually known as the FA Cup). Huddersfield Town won the competition, beating Preston North End 1–0 in the final at Stamford Bridge, London.

Matches were scheduled to be played at the stadium of the team named first on the date specified for each round, which was always a Saturday. If scores were level after 90 minutes had been played, a replay would take place at the stadium of the second-named team later the same week. If the replayed match was drawn further replays would be held at neutral venues until a winner was determined. If scores were level after 90 minutes had been played in a replay, a 30-minute period of extra time would be played.

Calendar
The format of the FA Cup for the season had two preliminary rounds, six qualifying rounds, four proper rounds, and the semi finals and final.

First round proper
12 qualifiers and 41 (out of 44) Division 1 & 2 clubs joined this round. Coventry City and Rotherham County of Division 2 were entered in the fifth qualifying round. First Division side Birmingham had their entry rejected after they failed to submit the relevant paperwork.
Of the Division 3S sides, Aberdare Athletic and Charlton Athletic were entered in the extra preliminary round (though the latter did not play), while nine sides entered the fifth qualifying round (Brentford. Bristol Rovers, Exeter City, Gllingham, Merthyr Town, Newport County, Northampton Town, Norwich City and Swansea Town).  The eleven others were given byes to the first round proper.  These were:

Watford
Brighton & Hove Albion
Luton Town
Swindon Town
Queens Park Rangers
Millwall
Plymouth Argyle
Southampton
Portsmouth
Southend United
Reading

Of the Division 3N sides, Halifax Town and Wigan Borough took no part in the competition.  Nine sides were entered in the fourth qualifying round (Darlington, Durham City, Grimsby Town, Hartlepools United, Lincoln City, Rochdale, Southport, Stockport County and Wrexham) and the rest in the fifth qualifying round.

32 matches were scheduled to be played on Saturday, 7 January 1922. Eleven matches were drawn and went to replays in the following midweek fixture, of which one went to another replay.

Second round proper
The 16 Second Round matches were played on Saturday, 28 January 1922. Five matches were drawn, with replays taking place in the following midweek fixture. One of these, the Bradford City–Notts County match, went to a second replay.

Third round proper
The eight Third Round matches were scheduled for Saturday, 18 February 1922. Four matches were drawn and went to replays in the following midweek fixture.

Fourth round proper
The four Fourth Round matches were scheduled for Saturday, 4 March 1922. There were three replays, each played in the following midweek fixture.

Semi-finals

The semi-final matches were played on Saturday, 25 March 1922. The matches ended in victories for Preston North End and Huddersfield Town, who went on to meet in the final at Wembley.

Final

The Final was contested by Huddersfield Town and Preston North End at Stamford Bridge. Huddersfield won by a single goal, a penalty scored by Billy Smith.

Match details

See also
FA Cup Final Results 1872-

References
General
Official site; fixtures and results service at TheFA.com
1921-22 FA Cup at rsssf.com
1921-22 FA Cup at soccerbase.com

Specific

 
FA Cup seasons
FA
Cup